The Leonard Series is a geologic group in Oklahoma. It preserves fossils dating back to the Permian period.

See also

 List of fossiliferous stratigraphic units in Oklahoma
 Paleontology in Oklahoma

References
 

Geology of Oklahoma
Permian System of North America